Li Muchen (born 17 August 1993) is a Chinese actress.

Filmography

Television series

References

External links 

 

1993 births
Living people
Actresses from Shanghai
Chinese film actresses
Chinese television actresses
21st-century Chinese actresses
People from Shanghai